Melton is a satellite city located  west from Melbourne CBD. It is the administrative centre of the City of Melton local government area and its most populous centre. At June 2019 Melton had an urban population of 72,177, and has grown steadily with an average annual rate of 5.01% year-on-year for the five years to 2019. It is considered part of the Greater Melbourne metropolitan area and is included in the capital's population statistical division.

On 20 October 1862, Melton was declared a Road District at a meeting held at the Melton Hotel when residents elected by ballot ten members to form the Melton Road Board. City of Melton local government area celebrated its 150th anniversary in 2021. Melton began as a small town before being declared a satellite city in 1974, separated from Melbourne's urban area by a green wedge.  Since the 1990s it has experienced rapid suburban growth into surrounding greenfield land and has become a commuter town in the Melbourne-Ballarat growth corridor.  Changes to Melbourne's urban growth boundary passed by the state government in 2010 effectively relinquish its satellite city status as it is planned to become part of Melbourne's future conurbation.

It is named after Melton Mowbray in the United Kingdom.

History

Pre-settlement history 
The land to the east of the Werribee River was the traditional home of the Wurundjeri and Boon Wurrung people, and to the west, the traditional home of the Wadawurrung. Mount Cottrell is jointly managed by Wurundjeri and Boon Wurrung.

19th Century 
Melton was first settled by squatters establishing sheep runs in the area in the 1830s and a small settlement benefited from traffic passing through it on the way to the Ballarat gold fields during the Victorian Gold Rush. The post office opened on 1 March 1856.

The area was declared a satellite city in 1974 and a green belt existed between it and the urban area of Melbourne until the late 1990s.

Geography
Melton is located on mostly flat, largely featureless, former volcanic plains.

To the south-east of Melton Township is Mount Cottrell, a blast-shield volcano, and to the north-east of the township is Mount Kororoit.  Mount Cottrell produced some of the largest lava flows in the western Victoria. These two volcanoes are some of the easternmost volcanoes on the Victorian Volcanic Plain which extends to the South Australian border.

City and suburbs
The population of Melton remained stable at around 1000-1500 until the mid 1950s, rising to 1800 in 1962 and doubling to 3600 in 1968. The first of the larger residential estates was Delphic Realty's Melton Views Estate in 1964. It contains the area known as The Birdcage.

Melton consists of seven suburban areas forming a single urban area with the locality of Melton at its centre. In the south of Melton are the suburbs of Melton South and Brookfield. In the north are Kurunjang and Toolern Vale while in the west is the suburb of Melton West. On 9 February 2017, a new division called Harkness was gazetted in the north west.

High Street is the main activity centre, but the urban area lacks a true central business district, with retail, business and civic facilities largely decentralised across the urban area. When the town was first established the east end of High Street was the centre of town containing the police station, post office, court house, grocery stores, blacksmith and pubs.

Additional shopping centres can be found in Melton South at the railway station, and in Melton West (Woodgrove Shopping Centre). Woodgrove Shopping Centre expanded in 2013 and now is the area's largest shopping venue, consisting of a Coles, Woolworths, Big W, Kmart, Reading Cinemas and approximately 160 specialty stores.

The Melton Botanic Garden is located in the suburb of Melton.

Arts and culture

Many live performances are held at the Melton Civic Centre, on High Street, and also at the Tabcorp Park racing complex, on Ferris Road, Melton South.

Each year the Djerriwarrh Festival is held in the city in November. The festival includes a street parade down High Street, two-day market stalls, and the Lions Club Carnival, held in the Police Paddock on High Street.

Contemporary public art includes Growth, Clocktower and Unearthed.

Melton Library and Learning Hub was It is the first library in Australia to be awarded a 5 Star Green Star rating from the Green Building Council of Australia. It has a theatre, recording studio, wall space for exhibitions and runs free public programs.

Sport
Melton is the home of the harness racing complex Tabcorp Park, and is the base for Harness Racing Victoria. The 2009 Australasian Breeders Crown was the first major race meeting held at the venue in August 2009.

Melton is also home to the Victorian Blokart Association at McPherson Park, about 7 km north of the CBD.

The Melton Basketball Association is the city's largest sporting club, with over 1,000 members. Along with local junior and senior competitions, The 'Thoroughbreds' also have representative teams competing statewide.

The City of Melton boasts two Hockey Victoria Hockey Clubs. Formed in 2016 Caroline Springs Hockey Club are a new community sporting club catering for the growth areas of the City of Melton's Eastern corridor, currently training at The Bridge Road Sports Precinct. Achieving its first on field success in the HV Sixers competition, both the CSHC men's and women's teams won the inaugural tournaments. These successes are in addition to the award of the Hockey Victoria Coach of the Year 2016 nomination for women's coach Ron Shadbolt. Caroline Springs Hockey Club enter teams into the Juniors and Seniors pennant and Metro competitions.

The Melton Mustangs Hockey Club currently enters Seniors, Masters and Juniors in the Victorian state leagues. The Masters team have achieved most recent success in 2013/14 when gaining back to back Pennants, whilst the Women's section have just finished in their highest league position in their 40-year history. The club is based at The Bridge Road Sports Precinct. The Club celebrated its 40th anniversary in 2016.

Melton Broncos play rugby league in Victorian Competition. 

Melton Warriors are Melton's only Rugby Union team and play in the VRU Competition. Making the finals 3 times in the last 5 years.

In 2015, Melton became home to the area's first American Gridiron Club, one of 12 clubs competing in the Gridiron Victoria League. Melton Wolves Gridiron Club was initially formed as Victoria's first ever stand-alone Women's Gridiron club, but quickly expanded and now also boasts a Senior Men's Team.

Melton Shire Council also operates the Melton Waves Leisure Centre, the only Leisure Centre in Melbourne's west with extensive aquatic facilities with a total of seven pools, including a hot tub, wave pool and pools suitable for toddlers and pools dedicated for lap swimming and hydrotherapy, in addition to a gym and fitness classes for all.

Governance

Melton is the administrative centre for the City of Melton. The City of Melton's Coburn Ward covers the central Melton area.

Its state electorate is Melton and its federal electorate is Hawke, currently held by Sam Rae. Since its inception in 1992, Melton has elected only Labor members. Hawke was won by Labor at its first election in 2022

Media
All areas of Melton receive the same analogue and digital television stations as Melbourne. It is also within the broadcast range of all commercial radio stations from Melbourne, and is an end point for digital radio broadcasts in metropolitan Melbourne. Digital radio is available in most of the city but signal diminishes towards the west.

Melton has one local newspaper, Starweekly Melton.

The city is also home to a radio station, 979fm.

Transport

Road transport and in particular the motor vehicle are the main form of transport. Melton has been identified by the Department of Transport as one of the most car-dependent communities in Greater Melbourne. As such its residents rely heavily on its substantial network of busy roads. The Western Freeway connects Melton with Melbourne's west runs through the urban area to the south, but bypasses the city centre which is located along High Street, a very wide dual carriageway with service lanes.  There are two major freeway interchanges at the centre of the urban area.  Both are diamond interchanges, one at Coburns Road which is the main north-south arterial and another for Ferris Road/Melton Highway (C754) on the eastern fringe.  These interchanges generate heavy traffic congestion and are major accident blackspots. A road reservation exists for a third diamond interchange at Bulmans Road on the western fringe. The C754 is a popular alternative route to the northern suburbs of Melbourne and branches north to the Melton-Gisborne Road (C705) at Kurrunjang connecting Melton to Gisborne. The roads play an important role in public transport with Transit Systems Victoria routes serving the suburbs between 5:30am-9pm on weekdays and 8am-9pm on weekends connect the suburbs to the railway station and also Melbourne's outer suburbs including the 456 to Sunshine via Caroline Springs; 457 from Melton West to the railway station; 458 Kurunjang to the railway station; and 459 Arnolds Creek to the railway station via Westlake. Coach services run from a terminal at the railway station and include Bacchus Marsh Coaches operates school bus services in Melton with connections to Rockbank, Toolern Vale, Bacchus Marsh and Sunbury. A shuttle bus provides direct services from Melton to Melbourne Airport.

Rail transport includes both passenger rail and freight rail. The township's only station is Melton railway station (located in Melton South) which is on the Serviceton railway line. Despite being within Melbourne's metropolitan area and within Metropolitan Zone 2, rail travelers rely on diesel locomotive passenger train services operated by V/Line. Some VLocity Ballarat services, Ararat services, as well as most Bacchus Marsh services stop at Melton en route to and from Southern Cross station. A high frequency is available due to the different services, but the journey time to Southern Cross as a result can range from 27–48 minutes during peak travel times. An electrification for the Melton Line was mentioned in the Western Rail Upgrade, along with other upgrades and extensions to the Suburban Rail Network The railway station is a very popular park and ride locality; however, it has been criticised due to poor parking infrastructure.

Melton Airfield, located to the north in Toolern Vale provides general aviation.

Education
Melton and its surrounding suburbs have several primary and secondary schools.

Primary schools
 Melton Primary School – Unitt Street
 St. Dominic's Catholic Primary School – Church Street
 Wedge Park Primary School – Cambrian Way, Melton West 
 St. Catherine of Siena Primary School – Bulmans Road, Melton West 
 St. Anthony of Padua Primary School – Wilson Road, Melton South
 Melton South Primary School – Station Road, Melton South
 Melton West Primary School – West Melton Drive, Melton West 
 Coburn Primary School – Richards Road, Melton South
 Exford Primary School
 Kurunjang Primary school
 Toolern Vale and District Primary School – Creamery Road, Toolern Vale
 Arnold's Creek Primary

Secondary schools
 Kurunjang Secondary College – Kurunjang Drive, Kurunjang
 Melton Secondary College – Coburns Road and High Street, Melton West
 Saint Francis Catholic College (formerly Catholic Regional College Melton) – Bulmans Road, Melton West
 Staughton College (formerly Wilson Park Secondary College) – Wilson Road, Melton South
 Melton Christian College – 152-156 Brooklyn Rd., Brookfield 3338
 Heathdale Christian College - Melton Campus – 102-112 Centenary Ave., Kurunjang (formerly Mowbray College from 1983 to 2012)

Specialist school
 Melton Specialist School – 159-211 Coburns Rd, Melton West  3337

Community groups
There are many non-religious, not-for-profit, non-sport community groups in Melton. These include 979FM (3RIM) Community Radio Station, Melton Girl Guides, Scouts, Rotary clubs, Lions clubs, Friends of the Melton Botanical Gardens, Friends of Toolern Creek, Artists’ Collective of Melton Inc., Australian Plants Society, Autism Angels Inc, Autism Spectrum Australia, Melton and District 4WD Club, Melton and District Adult Riding Club Inc., Melton and District Pony Club, Melton and District Riding for the Disabled, Melton Bridge Club, Melton Bushwalking Inc., Melton Cancer Support Group, Melton Dog Obedience Club, Melton Lifestylers Walking Group, Melton Melody Makers, Melton South Community Centre Inc. and Melton Toastmasters.

Notable people 
Main page: :Category:People from Melton, Victoria

 Paul Curtis - footballer, 2003 - .
 Matt Goggin -  footballer, 1936 - 1972
 Vanessa O'Hanlon - television presenter, 
 Brent Owens - chef, 1989 - .
 Dan Repacholi - olympic athlete, politician,  1982 -
 Henry Caselli Richards  - professor, geologist, teacher, 1884 – 1947
 John F. Shelton - footballer, 1903 -1983.
 Alf Smith (Australian footballer) - footballer, 1867 – 1936.
 Loudy Wiggins (nee Tourky) - olympic athlete, diver, 1979 - 
 Simon Wiggins - footballer, 1982 -

References

External links

 City of Melton official website
 History of Melton
 Contact details for Melton community groups

Towns in Victoria (Australia)
Suburbs of the City of Melton